Maleke Moye Idowu (born 14 February  1979) is a Nigerian comedian, Executive Director to Edo State Governor on Entertainment and the PMAN (Performing Musician Employers Association Of Nigeria) chairman Edo State Chapter musician, director, actor, and writer from Edo State, Nigeria.

Early life and education 
Maleke Moye Idowu was born in Benin City, where he attended Oguola primary school in Benin city. He attended secondary school at EdoKpolor Grammar school, and proceeded to Auchi Polytechnic, where he studied Business Administration.

Comedy career 
Maleke first performed comedy at the Nite of 1000 Laughs show, organized by Opa Williams. During that show, he worked alongside other comedians, such as I Go Dye, Basketmouth, Ali Baba, Igosave, gandoki, Okey Bakassey, Julius Agwu, Mike Ogbolosinger and others.

Music career 
Maleke as a recording artiste Musician has recorded numerous songs. His debut album which is titled Small Small with seven tracks in it was released in 2007. Maleke was better known from his music comedy with his hit track titled Mini Mini Wana Wana which was released in 2007, Mini Mini Wana wana was a trend of those days till tomorrow. In early 2015 Maleke released a single music he titled Cheeta Dance

Discography

Wanted

Other singles
 Pick it Up
 Nahio ft Jaywon
 Function ft 2Baba
 Pay U
 Erujeje ft Oritse femi
 "No Bother (2011)
 " Wedding Day"
 "Over f. Harrysong"
  "Cheeta Dance"

Awards
EAAN AWARDS 2013
Special Recognition Award 2013
Award of Excellence 2014
South South Music Award 2013
Nigeria Fashion Recognition 2014
Ehiglad Entertainment Award 2013
Niger Delta Universities Award 2013
EEMA Awards 2013

References

External links 
 Youtube
 Instagram
 Facebook

1979 births
Living people
Nigerian male comedians
People from Benin City
Entertainers from Edo State
Auchi Polytechnic alumni